The Vicariate Apostolic of Reyes is a Latin Church missionary ecclesiastical territory apostolic vicariate of the Catholic Church in Bolivia. Its cathedra is located in the episcopal see of Reyes.

History
On 1 September 1942 Pope Pius XII established the Vicariate Apostolic of Reyes from the Vicariate Apostolic of El Beni.

Apostolic Vicars
Giovanni Claudel, C.Ss.R. † (14 July 1943 – 12 December 1955) Died
José Alfonso Tscherrig, C.Ss.R. † (11 December 1956 – 11 December 1970) Resigned
Roger-Émile Aubry, C.Ss.R. † (14 June 1973 – 1 May 1999) Resigned
Carlos Bürgler, C.Ss.R. (1 May 1999 – 18 February 2019) Resigned
Waldo Rubén Barrionuevo Ramírez, C.Ss.R. (1 June 2019 – 7 July 2022) Died
Eugenio Coter, Apostolic Administrator (since 9 July 2022)

Coadjutor
Carlos Bürgler, C.Ss.R. (1977-1999), as Coadjutor Vicar Apostolic

Auxiliary Bishop
Waldo Rubén Barrionuevo Ramírez, C.Ss.R. (14 February 2014 – 1 June 2019)

See also
Roman Catholicism in Bolivia

Sources

Apostolic vicariates
Roman Catholic dioceses in Bolivia
Christian organizations established in 1942
1942 establishments in Bolivia
Roman Catholic ecclesiastical provinces in Bolivia